Abie may refer to:

People
Abie is a surname (probably derived from Alba)

Abie Grossfeld, former American Olympic champion gymnast and current American gymnastics coach
Abie Nathan, former Israeli humanitarian and peace activist
Cal Abrams (nicknamed "Abie"), former American Major League Baseball player

Other uses
Abie, Nebraska, a village in Butler County, Nebraska, United States
Australian Business in Europe (ABIE), a non-political international business networking organisation

See also
 Abie's Irish Rose (disambiguation)